Plant Engineering is a trade publication and web site owned by CFE Media.  It covers the field of plant engineering and maintenance in both manufacturing and non-manufacturing industries.

In April 2010, former owner Reed Business Information announced the magazine would close.  However later that month, Control Engineering, Consulting-Specifying Engineer and Plant Engineering were acquired by a new company, CFE Media.

References
Verified Audit

External links
Plant Engineering website
CFE Media website

1947 establishments in Illinois
Business magazines published in the United States
Monthly magazines published in the United States
Engineering magazines
Magazines established in 1947
Magazines published in Illinois
Professional and trade magazines